Sally Ellis née McDiarmid (born 17 May 1958) is a female English long-distance road and cross-country runner.

Athletics career
Ellis competed in the Marathon for Britain at the 1992 Summer Olympics and the 1991 World Championships in Athletics. She represented England in marathon event, at the 1990 Commonwealth Games in Auckland, New Zealand. Four years later she represented England again, at the 1994 Commonwealth Games in Victoria, British Columbia, Canada.

She was a member of Birchfield Harriers and founded a running and fitness group in Sutton Coldfield.

Competition Record

References

External links 
 
 
 

1958 births
Living people
Sportspeople from Hampshire
British female long-distance runners
English female long-distance runners
British female marathon runners
English female marathon runners
Olympic athletes of Great Britain
Athletes (track and field) at the 1992 Summer Olympics
Athletes (track and field) at the 1990 Commonwealth Games
Athletes (track and field) at the 1994 Commonwealth Games
Commonwealth Games competitors for England